The  rne-II RNA motif is a conserved RNA structure identified using bioinformatics.  It is detected only in species classified within the family Pseudomonadaceae, a group of gammaproteobacteria.  rne-II RNAs are consistently located in the presumed 5' untranslated regions (5' UTRs) of genes that encode Ribonuclease E (RNase E).  The RNase E 5' UTR element is a previously identified RNA structure that is also found in the 5' UTRs of RNase E genes.  However, the latter motif is found only in enterobacteria, and the two motifs have apparently unrelated structure.  In view of their differences, it was hypothesized that rne-II RNAs fulfill the same functional role as RNase E 5' UTR elements, which is to regulate the levels of RNase E proteins by acting as a substrate for RNase E.  Thus, when concentrations of RNase E are high, they will degrade their own messenger RNA.

References

External links
 

Cis-regulatory RNA elements